Quickstep is an album by pianist Kenny Barron which was recorded in 1991 and released on the German Enja label.

Reception 

In his review on Allmusic, Stephen Cook noted "Barron displayed his considerable writing and playing skills in the company of top New York jazz musicians, refining the sound heard on classic '60s Blue Note releases ... A fine modern hard bop release".

Track listing 
All compositions by Kenny Barron except where noted.

 "Once upon a Time" (John Stubblefield) – 8:10
 "I Wanted to Say" (Victor Lewis) – 8:23
 "Until Then" - 7:36
 "Hindsight" (Cedar Walton) – 7:51
 "Quick Step" - 5:52
 "Here and There" (John Stubblefield) – 7:26
 "Big Girls" (Lewis) – 15:41

Personnel 
Kenny Barron – piano
Eddie Henderson – trumpet
John Stubblefield – tenor saxophone
David Williams – bass
Victor Lewis – drums

References 

Kenny Barron albums
1991 albums
Enja Records albums
Albums recorded at Van Gelder Studio